Fire Country is an American action drama television series created by Max Thieriot, Tony Phelan and Joan Rater and produced by Jerry Bruckheimer for CBS, starring Thieriot. It premiered on October 7, 2022. In January 2023, the series was renewed for a second season.

Premise
Bode Donovan is a young convict with a troubled past. Hoping to redeem himself and shorten his prison sentence, he volunteers for the California Conservation Camp Program in which prisoners assist the California Department of Forestry and Fire Protection, known as Cal Fire. He ends up getting assigned to his hometown in Northern California where he must work alongside former friends, other inmates and elite firefighters putting out the huge fires that plague the region.

Cast

Main
 Max Thieriot as Bode Donovan (aka Bode Leone)
 Kevin Alejandro as Manny Perez, Gabriella’s father and captain of Cal Fire where Bode is sent
 Jordan Calloway as Jake Crawford, ex-boyfriend of Riley and Gabriella, and a firefighter.
 Stephanie Arcila as Gabriella Perez, Manny’s daughter and probationary firefighter.
 Jules Latimer as Eve Edwards, firefighter with Jake under Vince's command
 Diane Farr as Sharon Leone, Vince’s wife, Riley’s mother, Bode Donovan’s mother and Cal Fire Division Chief
 Billy Burke as Vince Leone, Riley’s father, Bode Donovan’s father and Cal Fire Battalion Chief

Recurring
 W. Tré Davis as Freddy "Goat" Mills, Cal Fire inmate and Bode's friend.
 Michael Trucco as Luke, Vince's brother
 Jade Pettyjohn as Riley Leone, Vince and Sharon's deceased daughter, Bode's younger sister, Eve's best friend
 Sabina Gadecki  as Cara, Bode's ex-girlfriend
 April Amber Telek as Dolly Burnet, Bode's aunt
 Aaron Pearl as Chief Paulie Burnett, Bode's uncle
 Zach Tinker as Collin O'Reilly, a humble, charming, and talented probie firefighter
Katrina Reynolds as Cookie, Freddy's girlfriend
Karen LeBlanc as Dr. Lilly Crawford, Mother of Jake
Fiona Rene as Rebecca Lee, female inmate and former attorney (season 1)
Julianne Christie as Kate
Barclay Hope as Father Pascal
JP Padda as Andy
Ian Tracey as Wes
 Rebecca Mader as Faye, the head of a private concierge firefighting company
 Kanoa Goo as Kyle

Episodes

Production

Development
In November 2021, CBS announced it was developing a series with Thieriot, Tony Phelan and Joan Rater, based on Thierot's experiences growing up in Northern California fire country. The potential series was then known as Cal Fire. In February 2022, a series pilot was green-lit. The pilot was written by Phelan and Rater, with Thieriot as co-writer, and directed by James Strong. In May 2022, CBS picked up the series, now titled Fire Country. Tia Napolitano would serve as the series showrunner. On October 19, 2022, the series received a full season order. On January 6, 2023, CBS renewed the series for a second season.

Filming
Filming of the series began on July 21, 2022 in Vancouver, Canada, and is scheduled to continue until April 5, 2023. The series uses the nearby village of Fort Langley to portray the fictional Northern California town of Edgewater. Additionally establishing shots for the city of Edgewood were filmed in Rio Dell, in Humboldt County, California, where the show is set.

Casting
In February 2022, it was announced that Thieriot would star in the series. In March 2022, Burke and Alejandro were given lead roles in the pilot. A few days later, it was announced that Farr, Calloway, Arcila, and Latimer would be appearing as series regulars. In September 2022, it was announced that Trucco would be joining the show in a recurring role. In January 2023, it was reported that Zach Tinker joined the cast in undisclosed capacity. In March 2023, it was announced that Rebecca Mader and Kanoa Goo were cast in recurring roles.

Broadcast
Fire Country premiered on October 7, 2022, on CBS in the United States.

Internationally, the series premiered in Australia on January 11, 2023 on Network 10.

Reception

Critical response

The review aggregator website Rotten Tomatoes reported a 50% approval rating with an average rating of 4.3/10, based on 8 critic reviews. Metacritic, which uses a weighted average, assigned a score of 55 out of 100 based on 5 critics, indicating "mixed or average reviews".

Katie Dowd, writing for SFGATE, accused Fire Country of being exploitative and "inaccurate."

Cal Fire response
Prior to the show's release, Cal Fire Chief Joe Tyler released a statement denying any involvement in the creation of the show, saying that "this television series is a misrepresentation of the professional all-hazards fire department and resource protection agency that Cal Fire is." Particular objection was made to a scene in the series' trailer inovling an inmate fighting a member of Cal Fire.

Tim Edwards, the president of Cal Fire’s union, Local 2881, added that "we have spoken with our legal team, and we cannot prevent the series from airing or using the Cal Fire name." An attempt was made to legally require a disclaimer before and after each episode that disavowed involvement from Cal Fire, but was unsuccessful. After seeing the full pilot, Edwards continued to disapprove of the show and added criticism over inmates not being punlished for multiple rule violations that would normally result in an immediate return to prison.

Showrunner Tia Napolitano replied to the criticisms saying “I had almost no response. I know we are making an entertainment show. It’s not a documentary. We do our absolute best.” Jeff Snider, a retired firefighter and one of the show's consultants, noted the New York City Police Department did not comment on the realism of Law & Order and said Cal Fire's unusual response was because “just in general with firefighters, we are very good at finding the flaw with each other.”

Ratings

References

External links

2020s American drama television series
2022 American television series debuts
American action television series
English-language television shows
Television series about firefighting
Television series by CBS Studios
Television shows filmed in Vancouver
Television shows set in California
CBS original programming